Courier, also known as Messenger Boy is a 1986 Soviet comedy-drama film directed by Karen Shakhnazarov. It was entered into the 15th Moscow International Film Festival where it won a Special Prize.

Plot
Ivan Miroshnikov, а 17-year-old high school graduate, fails to enter university and gets fixed up with a job as a courier (delivery person) in a small publishing company. At the same time his parents get divorced. His ironic and careless attitude to his new miserable job covers the deep confusion of his soul. By pure accident he meets a girl named Katya, daughter of a famous professor. She is bored with her perfect family and ordinary prosperity, and they start dating. But her sudden interest gradually fades away because she doesn't have enough strength for deliberate protest and Ivan, truthfully, is not particularly interested in her. Soon she returns to her old environment, and he stays face-to-face with his near future.

Cast
  – Ivan, courier
 Anastasiya Nemolyaeva – Katya
 Oleg Basilashvili – Semyon Petrovich, Katya's father
 Inna Churikova – Lydia Alekseevna, Ivan's mother
 Aleksandr Pankratov-Chyorny – Stepan Afanasyevich, editor-in-chief
 Svetlana Kryuchkova – Zinaida Pavlovna, secretary
 Vladimir Menshov – Oleg Nikolaevich, guest at Katya's birthday

References

External links

 Watch Courier online at official Mosfilm site (with English subtitles)

1986 films
1986 comedy-drama films
Soviet comedy-drama films
Russian comedy-drama films
Films set in 1986
Films set in Moscow
Films set in the Soviet Union
Films shot in Moscow
Films shot in Moscow Oblast
1980s Russian-language films
Films directed by Karen Shakhnazarov
Films scored by Eduard Artemyev
1986 comedy films
1986 drama films
Soviet teen films